Leyen, Leyens, or variation, may refer to:

Places
 Leyen, Moselle, Lorraine, Grand-Est, France; an alternate name of Ley, France, formerly Leyen, Germany
 Principality of Leyen, a defunct Germanic principality in Baden-Württemberg, once ruled by the House of Leyen
 De Leyens, Buytenwegh de Leyens, Zoetermeer, South Holland, Netherlands

People
 House of Leyen, a Germanic princely noble house, whose name derives from the principality it ruled
 Leyén Zulueta (born 1979) Cuban judoka

Other uses
 Ter Leyen Castle, Boekhoute, Belgium
 De Leyens RandstadRail station, Zoetermeer, Netherlands; a train station on RandstadRail

See also

 
 
 
 von der Leyen (disambiguation)
 Leye (disambiguation)
 Ley (disambiguation)